This is a list of the National Register of Historic Places listings in Fairbanks North Star Borough, Alaska.

This is intended to be a complete list of the properties and districts on the National Register of Historic Places in Fairbanks North Star Borough, Alaska, United States.  The locations of National Register properties and districts for which the latitude and longitude coordinates are included below, may be seen in an online map.

There are 32 properties and districts listed on the National Register in the borough, including 3 National Historic Landmarks.

Current listings

|}

Former listings

|}

See also

 List of National Historic Landmarks in Alaska
 National Register of Historic Places listings in Alaska

References

 
Fairbanks